Roper Lake State Park is a state park of Arizona, surrounding  Roper Lake.

The land for the park, formerly a ranch, was purchased by the state in 1972 in order to construct a reservoir.

Roper Lake State Park includes a boat ramp, a beach for swimming, a picnic area, a campground, cabins, and a hot spring. The lake is stocked with bass and trout, and boats are limited to small electric motors. Hiking trails are available, and the park is a place for birdwatching. This scenic park in southeast Arizona is in a beautiful location surrounded by the sky island Pinaleño Mountains range, including Mount Graham.

This  pond also offers fishing, a picnic area, and hiking trails.

Fish species
Rainbow Trout
Largemouth Bass
Sunfish
Channel Catfish

References

External links
Roper Lake State Park
Arizona Fishing Locations Map
Arizona Boating Locations Facilities Map

State parks of Arizona
Parks in Graham County, Arizona
Reservoirs in Graham County, Arizona
Safford, Arizona micropolitan area
Protected areas established in 1972
1972 establishments in Arizona